Jai Hanuman may refer to:

 Jai Hanuman (1997 TV series)
 Jai Hanuman (2018 TV series)